Thomas Davidson may refer to:

Thomas Davidson (printer) (fl. early 16th century), Scottish printer in the reign of James V
Thomas Davidson (palaeontologist) (1817–1885), Scottish palaeontologist
Thomas Davidson (poet) (1838–1870), Anglo-Scottish poet
Thomas Davidson (philosopher) (1840–1900), Scottish philosopher
Thomas Davidson (painter) (1842–1919), English painter
Thomas G. Davidson (1805–1883), U.S. Representative from Louisiana
Thomas Scott Davidson (1858–1933), Canadian auctioneer and politician
Thomas Davidson (naval architect) (1828–1874), naval constructor in the United States Navy
Thomas Whitfield Davidson (1876–1974), U.S. federal judge
Tommy Davidson (born 1963), American actor
Tommy Davidson (footballer) (1873–1949), Scottish footballer
Rex Davidson (Thomas Rex Davidson, 1927–2017), Australian cricketer
Thomas Davidson (South African cricketer) (1906–1987), South African cricketer